The Journal of the Royal Statistical Society is a peer-reviewed scientific journal of statistics. It comprises three series and is published by Oxford University Press for the Royal Statistical Society.

History 

The Statistical Society of London was founded in 1834, but would not begin producing a journal for four years. From 1834 to 1837, members of the society would read the results of their studies to the other members, and some details were recorded in the proceedings. The first study reported to the society in 1834 was a simple survey of the occupations of people in Manchester, England. Conducted by going door-to-door and inquiring, the study revealed that the most common profession was mill-hands, followed closely by weavers.

When founded, the membership of the Statistical Society of London overlapped almost completely with the statistical section of the British Association for the Advancement of Science. In 1837 a volume of Transactions of the Statistical Society of London were written, and in May 1838 the society began its journal. The first editor-in-chief of the journal was Rawson W. Rawson. In the early days of the society and the journal, there was dispute over whether or not opinions should be expressed, or merely the numbers. The symbol of the society was a wheatsheaf, representing a bundle of facts, and the motto Aliis exterendum, Latin for "to be threshed out by others." Many early members chafed under this prohibition, and in 1857 the motto was dropped.

From 1838 to 1886, the journal was published as the Journal of the Statistical Society of London. In 1887 it was renamed the Journal of the Royal Statistical Society when the society was granted a Royal Charter.

On its centenary in 1934, the society inaugurated a Supplement to the Journal of the Royal Statistical Society to publish work on industrial and agricultural applications. In 1948 the society reorganised its journals and the main journal became the Journal of the Royal Statistical Society,  Series A (General) and the supplement became Series B (Statistical Methodology). In 1988, Series A changed its name to Series A (Statistics in Society).

In 1952, the society founded Applied Statistics of the Journal of the Royal Statistical Society which became Series C (Applied Statistics). After merging with the Institute of Statisticians in 1993, the society published Series D (The Statistician), but this journal was closed in 2003, to be replaced by Significance.

Discussion papers 
Traditionally papers were presented at ordinary meetings of the society and those present, whether fellows or not, were invited to comment on the presentation. The paper and subsequent discussion would then be published in the journal. This followed a format used by other scientific societies of the time, such as the Royal Society. This practice continues although papers are selected for reading and go through peer review before being presented. It is considered a significant recognition to be invited to present a paper at an ordinary meeting of the society. This selection is currently done by the research section of the society for Series B and by an appointed editor for Series A&C. Papers are selected to be of importance and wide interest in terms of application or applicability.

Any person is invited to attend discussion meetings and contribute to the discussion although they are limited to 5 minutes speaking time. Following the formal presentation of the paper, two speakers are invited to comment by prior arrangement. Formally they are there to propose and second the 'vote of thanks' and would have respectively praised and criticised the presentation. Contributions to the discussion are not peer reviewed but are limited to 400 words in the journal.

Current series 
As of 2009, three series are published under this general title.

Journal of the Royal Statistical Society, Series A (Statistics in Society) 
Statistics in Society is published quarterly. Its 2021 impact factor is 2.175.

Past and current editors:

 1987–1990: Harvey Goldstein
 1989–1992: S M Gore
 1991–1994: D Holt
 1993–1996: S G Thompson
 1995–1998: I F Plewis
 1997–2000: G M Raab
 1999–2001: C D Payne
 2001–2004: Nicola Best
 2002–2005: P J Lynn
 2004–2004: J Haigh
 2005–2008: Geert Verbeke
 2006–2010: Antony Fielding
 2009–2012: Simon Day
 2011–2014: Arnaud Chevalier
 2013–2016: Linda Sharples
 2015–2018: Harvey Goldstein
 2017–2020: James Carpenter
 2019–2022: Jouni Kuha
 2021–2024: Bianca de Stavola
 2023–2026: Mike Elliott

Journal of the Royal Statistical Society, Series B (Statistical Methodology) 
Statistical Methodology is published five times a year. Its 2021 impact factor is 4.933.

Starting in 1934, it was originally called Supplement to the Journal of the Royal Statistical Society, and in 1948 was changed to Journal of the Royal Statistical Society,  Series B (Methodological), before being changed to its current name in 1998.

In a 2003 survey of statisticians, Series B was perceived to have been one of the highest quality journals in statistics.

Past and current editors:

 1951–1959: J. O. Irwin
 1960–1964: N. T. J. Bailey
 1960–1964: D. R. Cox
 1965–1969: D. M. G. Wishart
 1965–1969: D. J. Bartholomew
 1970–1974: D. E. Barton
 1975–1978: M. Stone
 1978–1981: J. A. Anderson
 1978–1983: T. M. F. Smith
 1980–1983: P. Holgate
 1982–1985: P. M. E. Altham
 1984–1987: P. J. Diggle
 1986–1989: D. M. Titterington
 1988–1991: R. L. Smith
 1990–1993: John T. Kent
 1992–1995: Anthony C. Atkinson
 1994–1997: Alastair Young
 1996–1999: Chris Jones
 1998–2001: David Firth
 2000–2003: Anthony C. Davison
 2002–2005: Robin Henderson
 2004–2007: Andy Wood
 2006–2009: Christian Robert
 2008–2011: George Casella
 2010–2013: Gareth Roberts
 2012–2015: Ingrid van Keilegom
 2014–2017: Piotr Fryzlewicz
 2016–2019: David B Dunson
 2018–2021: Simon Wood
 2020–2022: Aurore Delaigle
 2021–2023: Steffen Lauritzen
 2022–2024: Q. Yao
 2023–2025: Daniela Witten

Journal of the Royal Statistical Society, Series C (Applied Statistics) 
Applied Statistics is published five times a year. Its 2021 impact factor is 1.680.

A review of the first 227 algorithms published as source code in Applied Statistics is available. The last such code was published in 1997.

Past and current editors:

 1987–1990: I. R. Dunsmore
 1989–1992: David J. Hand
 1991–1994: W. J. Krzanowski
 1993–1996: D. A. Preece
 1995–1998: S. M. Lewis
 1997–2000: J. N. S. Matthews
 1999–2002: A. W. Bowman
 2001–2004: Geert Molenberghs
 2003–2006: C. A. Glasbey
 2005–2008: M. S. Ridout
 2007–2010: Chris J. Skinner
 2009–2012: Stephen Gilmour
 2011–2014: Richard Chandler
 2013–2016: Peter W. F. Smith
 2015–2019: Nigel Stallard
 2017–2019: Richard Boys
 2019–2022: Nial Friel
 2020–2020: Peter W. F. Smith
 2021–2024: Janine Illian
 2023–2026: Thomas Kneib

Journal of the Royal Statistical Society, Series D (The Statistician) 
The Statistician is no longer published, but was published 4 times a year up to 2003, being replaced by Significance. The final editors were A.J. Watkins (University of Wales) and L.C. Wolstenholme (City University London). The Statistician was added in parallel to Series A-C as a Royal Statistical Society publication in 1993, having previously been published by the Institute of Statisticians.

Allied publications 
Since 2004 the Society has published Significance, which consists of articles on topics of statistical interest presented at a level suited to a general audience. From September 2010 Significance is jointly published with the American Statistical Association and distributed to members of both societies.

References

Further reading 
 (May 1838). "Introduction". Journal of the Statistical Society of London, 1 (1): 1–5. Retrieved on 2007-10-13.

External links 
 

Royal Statistical Society
Royal Statistical Society
Publications established in 1838
English-language journals
1838 establishments in the United Kingdom
Wiley-Blackwell academic journals
Academic journals associated with learned and professional societies of the United Kingdom